Nobo may refer to: 

 Nobo, a Kenyan location
 Nobø, a Norwegian manufacturing company
 Nobó, an Irish brand of dairy-free ice cream
 Abbreviation of Notified Body, an organisation that has been designated by a Member State to assess the conformity of certain products, before being placed on the E.U. market, with the applicable essential technical requirements
 NoBo (portmanteau of North Boardman), a residential neighborhood in Traverse City, Michigan